Critical Mass is a 2006 studio album release by the Dave Holland Quintet, the first one to feature drummer Nate Smith. Chris Potter, Robin Eubanks and Steve Nelson all return from previous projects. This is the first Holland album not to be released on the ECM label, through which he had released all of his albums since Conference of the Birds in 1972.

Reception
Steve Greenlee of JazzTimes stated "It’s been five years since Dave Holland’s quintet released an album of new material. The bassist hasn’t exactly been relaxing in the meantime; he put out two albums of big-band music and toured extensively, and released a stellar double-live CD by his quintet. And all the while, the least grateful among us have been hankering for some new music from Holland’s quintet. Well, here it is, and it holds its own against Prime Directive, the group’s most impressive release... The groupthink mentality manifests itself most obviously on the New Orleans tribute “Easy Did It,” for which Holland and Smith create a slithering, swelling rhythm that culminates in a five-way roundtable of near-chaos. Critical Mass will be on everyone’s list of 2006’s best." John Kelman of All About Jazz wrote, "Proof that it's possible to retain one's identity while breaking new ground, Critical Mass continues a streak of winning records for Holland that shows no sign of letting up." John Fordham of The Guardian added, " It's unflinching contemporary instrumental jazz, but as subtly melodic as Holland's bands always are."

Track listing
 "The Eyes Have It" (Dave Holland) - 7:00
 "Easy Did It" (Dave Holland) - 11:16
 "Vicissitudes" (Chris Potter) - 9:56
 "The Leak" (Nate Smith) - 5:42
 "Secret Garden" (Dave Holland) - 8:42
 "Lucky Seven" (Dave Holland) - 8:35
 "Full Circle" (Robin Eubanks) - 12:11
 "Amator Silenti" (Steve Nelson) - 9:17

Personnel
Chris Potter - tenor & soprano saxophones
Robin Eubanks - trombone
Steve Nelson - vibraphone, marimba & tambourine
Dave Holland - double bass
Nate Smith - drums

References

External links

Dave Holland albums
2006 albums
Sunnyside Records albums